Nizam Mamode is the Professor of transplantation surgery at Guy's and St Thomas' NHS Foundation Trust.

References

Living people
Year of birth missing (living people)